Kokuchou may refer to the following:

 "Kokuchou: 13 Japanese Birds Pt. 8", a song by Masami Akita
 Psychedelica of the Black Butterfly, a Japanese otome game
 "Kokuchō no Psychedelica", a song performed by Eiko Shimamiya
 Last Escort: Shinya no Kokuchou Monogatari, a Japanese otome game